Emīls Liepiņš (born 29 October 1992 in Dobele) is a Latvian cyclist, who currently rides for UCI WorldTeam . In October 2020, he was named in the startlist for the 2020 Vuelta a España.

Major results

2012
 3rd Jurmala Grand Prix
2014
 3rd Overall Tour of Estonia
2016
 3rd Tour of Yancheng Coastal Wetlands
 5th Minsk Cup
 10th Grand Prix Minsk
2017
 3rd Overall Tour of Hainan
 3rd Overall Dookoła Mazowsza
 3rd Minsk Cup
2018
 1st  Overall Baltic Chain Tour
1st  Points classification
1st Stage 2
 1st Poreč Trophy
 1st Heistse Pijl
 1st Stage 3 Istrian Spring Trophy
 4th GP Izola
 4th Minsk Cup
 5th Grand Prix Minsk
 8th Rutland–Melton CiCLE Classic
2019
 1st Stage 1a Settimana Internazionale di Coppi e Bartali
 National Road Championships
3rd Time trial
5th Road race
 4th Ronde van Drenthe
 4th Ronde van Limburg
 6th Tour de l'Eurométropole
 8th Scheldeprijs
 10th Circuit de Wallonie
2020
 6th Trofeo Campos, Porreres, Felanitx, Ses Salines 
2021
 2nd Time trial, National Road Championships
2022
 National Road Championships
1st  Road race
3rd Time trial
 2nd Serenissima Gravel
 9th Grand Prix de Fourmies

Grand Tour general classification results timeline

References

External links

1992 births
Living people
Latvian male cyclists
People from Dobele